5th Dog Let Loose is the second solo studio album by American rapper Flesh-n-Bone. It was released on October 10, 2000, via Koch Records. Recording sessions took place at Studio 56, at LAfx, and at The Enterprise in Hollywood. Production was handled by Damon Elliott, The Professor, Rhythm D, Erik Nordquist, and Flesh-n-Bone himself. It features guest appearances from Layzie Bone, Ms. Chaz, B.G. Knocc Out, Damon Elliott, Kurupt, Montell Jordan and Wish Bone. The album peaked at number 98 on the Billboard 200, number 30 on the Top R&B/Hip-Hop Albums and number 3 on the Independent Albums in the United States.

Word of the album originally surfaced in 1998 with a different title "Book of T.H.U.G.S.", but due to Flesh-N-Bone's incarceration the album wasn't released until three years later with a new name and a new label. Also due to Flesh's incarceration the album was left unfinished. Despite all difficulties, 5th Dog Let Loose is considered by fans and some critics as his crowning achievement.

Track listing

Sample credits
Track 1 contains elements from "Mama" written by Michael Rutherford, Phil Collins and Anthony Banks
Track 2 contains elements from "Git Up, Git Out" written by Ray Murray, Patrick Brown, Rico Wade, André Benjamin, Antwan Patton, Cameron Gipp and Robert Barnett
Track 10 contains replay elements from "It's Funky Enough" written by Tracy Curry and J. Sylvers

Charts

References

External links

2000 albums
E1 Music albums
Horrorcore albums
Flesh-n-Bone albums
Albums produced by Rhythum D